State Route 559 (SR 559) is a north–south state highway in the central portion of the U.S. state of Ohio. The southern terminus of the highway is at the signalized junction of State Route 29 and State Route 4 in downtown Mechanicsburg.

Route description

State Route 559 runs through the eastern portion of Champaign County and the southeastern quadrant of Logan County.  No part of the highway is included within the National Highway System, a network of routes deemed most important for the nation's economy, mobility and defense.

History
Established in 1937, State Route 559 was originally routed along the same alignment that it occupies today through Champaign and Logan Counties.  The highway has not experienced any major changes to its routing since its inception.

Major intersections

References

External links

 Logan County Highway Map

559
Transportation in Logan County, Ohio
Transportation in Champaign County, Ohio